Kannagi is a legendary Tamil woman who forms the central character of the Tamil epic Silapathikaram.

Kannagi or Kannaki may also refer to:
 Kannagi, the queen of the Velir chieftain Pegan of the family of Vel Avi
 Kannaki Amman, the divine form of the Silappatikaram character
 Kannagi (film), a Tamil epic film
 Kannagi (newspaper), a Tamil language newspaper
 Kannagi (Shinto), the Japanese term for a shaman or a miko
 Kannagi: Crazy Shrine Maidens, a 2005 Japanese manga series by Eri Takenashi that was adapted into a 2008 anime television series
 Kannaki (film), a Malayalam film directed by Jayaraj